The Berdichev uezd was one of the subdivisions of the Kiev Governorate of the Russian Empire. It was situated in the western part of the governorate. Its administrative centre was Berdichev (Berdychiv).

Demographics
At the time of the Russian Empire Census of 1897, Berdichevsky Uyezd had a population of 279,695. Of these, 66.9% spoke Ukrainian, 23.1% Yiddish, 5.8% Polish, 3.6% Russian, 0.3% Czech and 0.2% German as their native language.

References

 
Uezds of Kiev Governorate
1846 establishments in the Russian Empire
1923 disestablishments in Ukraine